Pfitschigogerl (also: Fitschigogerl) is Austrian slang for a children's game that is a form of table soccer (foosball) played with coins and rulers.

Further reading

References

External links 
 1. Österreichischer Fitschigogerl Club (a club in Austria devoted to the game)

Tabletop games